Jenny-Julia Danielsson (born 30 August 1994) is a Finnish football midfielder who plays for Rangers W.F.C in the Scottish Women's Premier League and the Finland national team.

International goals

Honours

Club 
FC Honka
Winner
 Finnish Women's Cup (2): 2014, 2015
Rangers
 Scottish Women's Premier League Cup: 2022

References

External links 
 
 
 
 Jenny Danielsson profile  at Football Association of Finland (SPL) 
 Jenny Danielsson at AupaAthletic 
 
 

1994 births
Living people
Finnish women's footballers
Finland women's international footballers
Kansallinen Liiga players
Damallsvenskan players
Kristianstads DFF players
FC Honka (women) players
Women's association football midfielders
Expatriate women's footballers in Sweden
Finnish expatriate sportspeople in Sweden
Finnish expatriate sportspeople in Spain
Expatriate women's footballers in Spain
Kungsbacka DFF players
Sporting de Huelva players
AIK Fotboll (women) players
Elitettan players
UEFA Women's Euro 2022 players
Finnish expatriate sportspeople in Scotland
Expatriate women's footballers in Scotland
Rangers W.F.C. players
Scottish Women's Premier League players
Footballers from Espoo